Amber Joseph (born 15 December 1999) is a Barbadian professional racing cyclist, who is currently a guest rider for . She rode in the women's time trial event at the 2020 UCI Road World Championships, ultimately placing 47th out of 51 starters, with a time of 51:36.06 over the  course.

Major results 
2016
2nd Pan American Junior Track Championships (Omnium)
2017 
Pan American Junior Track Championships
1st  Omnium
1st  Points race
2020 
National Road Championships
1st  Road Race
1st  Time Trial
2021
National Road Championships
1st  Road Race
1st  Time Trial
2022
National Road Championships
1st  Road Race
1st  Time Trial

References

External links
 

1999 births
Living people
Barbadian female cyclists
Cyclists at the 2019 Pan American Games
Pan American Games competitors for Barbados
Cyclists at the 2018 Commonwealth Games
Commonwealth Games competitors for Barbados